Tara J. Yosso is a professor in the Graduate School of Education at the University of California, Riverside. Yosso's research and teaching apply the frameworks of critical race theory and critical media literacy to examine educational access and opportunity. She is specifically interested in understanding the ways Communities of Color have historically utilized an array of cultural knowledge, skills, abilities, and networks to navigate structures of racial discrimination in pursuit of educational equality. She has authored numerous collaborative and interdisciplinary chapters and articles in publications such as the Harvard Educational Review, International Journal of Qualitative Studies in Education, Journal of Popular Film and Television, and The Blackwell Companion to Social Inequalities. She has been awarded a Ford Foundation Postdoctoral Fellowship for Diversity and Excellence in University Teaching, and honored with a Derrick Bell Legacy Award from the Critical Race Studies in Education Association. She is extensively cited within and beyond the field of education.

Biography
Yosso is a first generation college student who grew up in San Jose, CA.  She earned her Bachelor of Arts in an individual major she designed, Social Psychology of Education with an emphasis in Chicana/o Studies from the University of California, Los Angeles in 1995. Yosso earned her Ph.D. in Education: Urban Schooling with a specialization in Chicana/o Studies and an emphasis in Visual Sociology from the University of California, Los Angeles in 2000.

Professor Yosso joined the Graduate School of Education as a recruit from the University of California, Riverside cluster hire, which focused on scholars working with the diverse U.S. populations who are part of what identified by Américo Paredes as “Greater Mexico.” Before this appointment, she was a professor in the School of Education and a faculty affiliate in Latina/o Studies at the University of Michigan. Prior to UM, she was an assistant and then associate professor with tenure in the Department of Chicana and Chicano Studies at the University of California, Santa Barbara. She earned her Ph.D. in urban schooling in the Graduate School of Education and Information Studies at the University of California, Los Angeles.

Selected publications
Yosso's dissertation, A Critical Race and LatCrit Approach to Media Literacy: Chicana/o Resistance to Visual Microaggressions, linked racial microaggressions, stereotype threat, the intersectionality of racialization for Latina/o students, and film portrayals. 
Her operationalization of racial microaggressions has become part of handbook definitions of racial microaggressions. Her 2009 Harvard Educational Review article positions this analysis of microaggressions alongside a critique of the assimilationist models utilized in higher education student affairs, shedding new light on campus racial climate and Chicana/o, Latina/o educational experiences. Her operationalization of mundane racism in subsequent publications (e.g. “A Few of the Brightest, Cleanest Mexican Children” (Harvard Educational Review) expands our understandings of why and how Mexican Americans persist as the most segregated children in the nation’s schools.

Yosso's unique contribution to developing a critical race theory in education framework engages research-based creative narratives—counterstories—that recount racially and socially marginalized perspectives. Her co-authored publications describe how a counterstorytelling methodology can illuminate educational experiences both individual and shared. Her 2006 book, Critical Race Counterstories along the Chicana/Chicano Educational Pipeline.  applied this method to examine Chicana/o experiences navigating from elementary through graduate school, embedding critical conceptual and theoretical content within an accessible counternarrative format. She challenges deficit interpretations of dismal academic statistics with composite characters who personify data themes and patterns. In 2008 the American Educational Studies Association awarded Critical Race Counterstories along the Chicana/Chicano Educational Pipeline the Critic's Choice Award.

Her article, “Whose Culture has Capital? A Critical Race Theory Discussion of Community Cultural Wealth” published in 2005 has been received as a paradigm shift in the framing of work with marginalized communities around the array of cultural knowledge, skills, abilities, and networks they possess and utilize to survive and resist racism and other forms of subordination. The article questions deficit interpretations of Pierre Bourdieu and cultural capital theory. Bourdieu astutely argues that social hierarchy is not reproduced by chance, but rather that those in power (elite Whites) restrict access to acquire and utilize specific forms of cultural, social, and economic capital. Through a deficit lens, however, Bourdieu’s critique of how hierarchy reproduces itself is utilized as a ‘how-to’ model, wherein Students of Color need to acquire the appropriate cultural capital or social capital to achieve academically. Yosso's article argues that shifting our lens away from a deficit view of Communities of Color, and considering their experiences in a critical historical light, we can document various forms of capital nurtured through cultural wealth including aspirational, navigational, social, linguistic, familial and resistant capital. These forms of capital draw on the knowledge Students of Color bring with them from their homes and communities into the classroom.”
Yosso's model community cultural wealth has become the impetus for a range of national and international projects centered on the cultural knowledge and assets in Communities of Color.

Selected work
 Solórzano, D.G. & T.J. Yosso. (2002). “Critical Race Methodology: Counterstorytelling as an Analytical Framework for Educational Research.” Qualitative Inquiry 8(1), 23–44
 Solórzano, D.G., M. Ceja, & T.J. Yosso. (2000, Winter/Spring). “Critical Race Theory, Racial Microaggressions, and Campus Racial Climate: The Experiences of African American College Students.” Journal of Negro Education 69(1/2), 60–73
 Yosso, T.J. & D.G. García. (2007). “‘This is No Slum!’: A Critical Race Theory Analysis of Community Cultural Wealth in Culture Clash’s Chavez Ravine.”  	Aztlán: A Journal of Chicano Studies 32(1), 145–179
 García, D.G., & T.J. Yosso. (2013). “‘Strictly in the Capacity of Servant’: The Interconnection Between Residential and School Segregation in Oxnard, California, 1934-1954.” History of Education Quarterly 53(1), 64–89
 Yosso, T.J., W.A. Smith, M. Ceja, & D.G. Solórzano. (2009, Winter). Critical Race Theory, Racial Microaggressions, and Campus Racial Climate for Latina/o Undergraduates. Harvard Educational Review 79(4), 659–690
 Yosso, T.J. (2002). “Critical Race Media Literacy: Challenging Deficit Discourse about Chicanas/os.” Journal of Popular Film and Television 30(1), 52–62
 Yosso, T.J. & D.G. García. (2010). “From Ms. J. to Ms. G.: Analyzing Racial Microaggressions in Hollywood’s Urban School Genre.” In, B. Frymer, T. Kashani, A.J. Nocella II, & R. Van Heertum (eds.). Hollywood’s Exploited: Public Pedagogy, Corporate Movies, and Cultural Crisis (pp. 85–103). New York: Palgrave Macmillan.
 Yosso, T.J. & C. Benavides Lopez. (2010). “Counterspaces in a Hostile Place: A Critical Race Theory Analysis of Campus Culture Centers.” In, L.D. Patton (Ed.). Culture Centers in Higher Education: Perspectives on Identity, Theory, and Practice (pp. 83–104) Sterling, VA: Stylus.
 Smith, W.A., T.J. Yosso, & D.G. Solórzano. (2006). “Challenging Racial Battle Fatigue on Historically White Campuses: A Critical Race Examination of Race-Related Stress.” In, C.A. Stanley (Ed.). Faculty of Color: Teaching in Predominantly White Colleges and Universities (pp. 299–327).  Bolton, MA: Anker Publishing, Inc.
 Yosso, T.J. & D.G. Solórzano. (2005). “Conceptualizing a Critical Race Theory in Sociology.” In, M. Romero & E. Margolis (eds.), The Blackwell Companion to Social Inequalities (pp. 117–146). Oxford, UK: Blackwell Publishing.
 García, D.G., T.J. Yosso, & F.P. Barajas. (2012). “‘A Few of the Brightest, Cleanest Mexican Children’: School Segregation as a Form of Mundane Racism in Oxnard, CA, 1900-1940,” Harvard Educational Review 82(1), 1–25.

References

External links
 University of California, Riverside profile

Year of birth missing (living people)
Living people
University of California, Los Angeles alumni
University of California, Riverside faculty
People from San Jose, California